Desmond Leonard Dolding (13 December 1922 – 23 November 1954) was an English footballer and cricketer.

Biography
Born in Nundygroog, South India, Dolding served as a bomb-aimer in the Royal Air Force during the Second World War.

He was a footballer playing as a winger for Chelsea (27 league appearances in 1946 – 1948) and Norwich City (12 appearances). He played non-league football for Wealdstone, Dover and Margate. Played in winning Wealdstone team in Middlesex Sports Red Cross final at Wembley in 1942 – beating RAF, Uxbridge in extra time. (said to be first amateur final played at Wembley)

He was on the MCC staff for seven years. His main claim to fame on the cricket pitch was as a 12th Man for England in the Lord's Test of 1949. He played only once for Middlesex, in 1951, but as a right-arm leg-break bowler took part in many games for MCC.

Death and afterward
On 12 November 1954, Dolding was a passenger in a car that collided with a trolley bus standard in Wembley. The car was being driven by Middlesex teammate Syd Brown. Dolding died on 23 November 1954.

References

Wisden's Cricketers Almanac 1955
http://www.margatehistory.co.uk/lendolding.htm

1922 births
1954 deaths
Royal Air Force personnel of World War II
Association football wingers
Chelsea F.C. players
Margate F.C. players
Norwich City F.C. players
Wealdstone F.C. players
Middlesex cricketers
English cricketers
Marylebone Cricket Club cricketers
English footballers
British people in colonial India
Road incident deaths in London